Siegriest is a surname. Notable people with the surname include:

Louis Siegriest (1899–1989), American painter
Lundy Siegriest (1925–1985), American painter

See also
Siegrist